Sallama is a Bedouin village in northern Israel. Located in the Galilee near the Tzalmon Stream, it falls under the jurisdiction of Misgav Regional Council. The village was recognized by the state in 1976.

History

Sallama has been identified as the site of the village of Selamin (Salmon or Tselamon) in the Roman Province of Galilee.

At some point between 1688 and 1692, the Zayadina family, who not long before moved to the nearby village of Arraba, had assaulted and destroyed Sallama, whose Druze sheikh controlled the Shaghur subdistrict to which both villages belonged. The Druze subsequently fled Sallama and at least eight other villages in the subdistrict, including Kammaneh and Dallata. At least some of these Druze migrated to the Hauran to join their co-religionists. The Zayadina meanwhile began their influence in the Galilee and gained the tax farm of Shaghur.

In 1875, on the top of the site Guérin found the remains of a rectangular enclosure, 80 paces by 50. Within the enclosure and along the walls have been built twenty crude vaulted chambers, which appeared to him modern. Besides the cisterns and caves mentioned by Lieutenant Kitchener, Guerin observed two presses cut in the rock.

In 1881,  the PEF's  Survey of Western Palestine  noted "This was a Druse village destroyed by the Zeidaneh, the family of Dhaher el 'Amr." They further noted "Heaps of stones, cisterns, and caves."

See also
Arab localities in Israel
Bedouin in Israel

References

Bibliography

External links
Survey of Western Palestine, Map 6: IAA,  Wikimedia commons

Arab villages in Israel
Bedouin localities in Israel
Populated places in Northern District (Israel)